Mark Everist (born 27 December 1956) is a British music historian, critic and musicologist.

Early life and career
Born in London, Everist was educated at Clifton College (Bristol) and studied at Dartington College of Arts (BA 1979), King's College London (MMus 1980), and Keble College, Oxford (DPhil 1985).

After taking up his first post as lecturer, then reader, in musicology at King's College London in 1982, he accepted a position at the University of Southampton in 1996 and was promoted to professor. He has served as Head of Department (1997–2001 and 2005–2009) and Associate Dean (Research) for the Faculty of Arts and Humanities (2010–2014). For the 2014/15 academic year he was Professorial Fellow at the Institute of Musical Research, London. He has held visiting positions at the Paris Conservatoire, the University of Western Australia, and the University of Melbourne.

Distinctions
Everist's publications have won the Westrup Prize of the Music & Letters trust, the Solie Prize of the American Musicological Society for the best collection of essays and the Slim Prize for the best article published in a refereed journal. He has been elected to the Academia Europaea and is a corresponding member of the American Musicological Society (only 16 UK scholars have received this distinction since the society's founding in 1937). He has been honoured by articles devoted to him in The New Grove Dictionary of Music and Musicians and in Die Musik in Geschichte und Gegenwart.

Everist was chair of the National Association of Music in Higher Education from 2005 until 2008, was elected President of the Royal Musical Association in 2011 and re-elected for a second term in 2014.

Publications
Everist's publications focus on the Ars Antiqua, music drama in nineteenth-century France, and reception theory. His latest monograph is Discovering Medieval Song: Latin Poetry and Music in the Conductus (Cambridge: Cambridge University Press, 2018). His previous monograph, Mozart's Ghosts: Haunting the Halls of Musical Culture (2012), investigates Mozart's reception in English, French, and German-speaking countries, and was reviewed as an "elegantly written, meticulously researched, anecdotally rich, intellectually and ethically subtle piece of scholarship". Earlier books examine the sources of polyphony and the motet in the thirteenth century, and French stage music in the nineteenth century. Everist has edited or co-edited five volumes, as well as three volumes in the series Le magnus liber organi de Notre Dame de Paris published by Editions de l'Oiseau-Lyre between 2001 and 2003. His articles in refereed journals and chapters in collected works number in excess of 60, and many of his articles have been translated into French, German, Japanese and Italian.

In his Arts and Humanities Research Council-funded project, Cantum pulcriorem invenire: Thirteenth-Century Latin Poetry and Music (CPI), Everist and a team of specialists at the University of Southampton investigated the medieval Conductus (2010–2016). The project produced three professional CDs of the repertory under examination and also supported four PhD dissertations and Everist's monograph entitled Discovering Medieval Song (Cambridge: Cambridge University Press, 2018). He is also the co-director of the network "France: Musiques, Cultures, 1789–1918".

Monographs
 French Thirteenth-Century Polyphony: Aspects of Sources and Distribution. New York and London: Garland, 1989.
 French Motets in the Thirteenth Century: Music, Poetry and Genre, Cambridge Studies in Medieval and Renaissance Music. Cambridge: Cambridge University Press, 1994. Paperback reprint 2004.
 Music Drama at the Paris Odéon, 1824–1828. Berkeley, Los Angeles and London: University of California Press, 2002.
 Giacomo Meyerbeer and Music Drama in Nineteenth-Century Paris. Variorum Collected Studies Series CS805. Aldershot: Ashgate, 2005.
 Mozart's Ghosts: Haunting the Halls of Musical Culture. New York: Oxford University Press, 2012.
 Discovering Medieval Song: Latin Poetry and Music in the Conductus. Cambridge: Cambridge University Press, 2018.
 Opera in Paris from the Empire to the Commune. London: Routledge, 2018.

Collections of essays
 Music Before 1600, Models of Musical Analysis 2. Oxford: Blackwell, 1992.
 Analytical Strategies and Musical Interpretation (co-edited with Craig Ayrey). Cambridge: Cambridge University Press, 1996.
 Rethinking Music (co-edited with Nicholas Cook). Oxford: Oxford University Press, 1999.
 Music, Theater and Cultural Transfer: Paris, 1830–1914 (co-edited with Annegret Fauser). Chicago: Chicago University Press, 2009.
 The Cambridge Companion to Medieval Music. Cambridge: Cambridge University Press, 2011.
 Meyerbeer and Grand Opéra: From the July Monarchy to the Present, Speculum musicae 28. Turnhout: Brepols, 2016.
 The Cambridge History of Medieval Music (co-edited with Thomas Forrest Kelly). Cambridge: Cambridge University Press, 2018.

Journal and other articles
Over 60 articles in various peer-reviewed journals, including:

 19th-Century Music
 Cambridge Opera Journal
 Early Music
 Early Music History
 Journal of Musicology
 Journal of the American Musicological Society
 Journal of the Royal Musical Association
 Music Analysis
 Musica disciplina
 Music & Letters
 Plainsong and Medieval Music
 Revue belge de musicologie
 Revue de musicologie
 Royal Musical Association Research Chronicle
 28 essays in various collections

References

External links
 Cantum pulcriorem invenire: Thirteenth-Century Latin Poetry and Music
 List of Publications

1956 births
Alumni of King's College London
British musicologists
Living people
People educated at Clifton College